Logovardi Airfield is a smallish aerodrome located in Bitola, North Macedonia.

Service
On 23 July 2007, the Logovardi airfield was used as a base for firefighting to combat wildfires within the region.

In the 1970s and 1980s, the Aero Club Mirko Todorovski hosted a popular air show each May. The airshow ended, however, after the breakup of Yugoslavia. On 24 May 2008, after 20 years of inactivity, the field was reopened as a gathering spot for air enthusiasts from across Macedonia. The annual air show has since been resumed by Mirko Todorovski. The most recent of these performances was the Bitola and Bitola Air Race which took place on 9 September 2011.

History
In 1935, Aeroput opened the Belgrade-Niš-Bitola line with a Spartan Cruiser II plane.

References

External links
 Bitola-Logovardi Airport hangar & ICP MXP-740 Savannah aircraft at concrete apron
 Utva 75 of Air Club Bitola (Z3-DCH) at Bitola-Logovardi Airport runway
 Pictures of Bitola-Logovardi Airport

Airports in North Macedonia
Buildings and structures in Bitola